The 2008 Individual Long Track/Grasstrack World Championship was the 38th edition of the FIM speedway Individual Long Track World Championship.

The world title was won by Gerd Riss of Germany for the seventh time.

Venues

Final Classification

References 

2008
Speedway competitions in the Czech Republic
Speedway competitions in France
Speedway competitions in Germany